Richard Scott Bakker (born February 2, 1967, Simcoe, Ontario) is a Canadian fantasy author and frequent lecturer in the South Western Ontario university community. He grew up on a tobacco farm in the Simcoe area. In 1986 he attended the University of Western Ontario to pursue a degree in literature and later an MA in theory and criticism. Since the late 1990s, he has been attempting to elucidate theories of media bubbles and the intellectual alienation of the working class. After all but dissertation in a PhD in philosophy at Vanderbilt University he returned to London, Ontario where he now lives with his wife and daughter. He spends his time writing split between his fiction and his ongoing philosophic inquiry.

Works

Fiction

The Second Apocalypse 
R. Scott Bakker's work is dominated by a sprawling series informally known as The Second Apocalypse which he began developing while in college in the 1980s. The series was originally planned as a trilogy with the first two books entitled The Prince of Nothing and The Aspect-Emperor. The third book has been referred to as The Book That Shall Not Be Named by Bakker, since the title of this book is considered to be a spoiler for the preceding volumes.

When Bakker began writing the series in the early 2000s, however, he found it necessary to split each of the three novels into its own sub-series to incorporate all of the characters, themes and ideas he wished to explore. Bakker originally conceived of seven books: a trilogy and two duologies. This later shifted to two trilogies and one duology, with the acknowledgment that the third series may also expand to a trilogy.

The Prince of Nothing trilogy was published between 2003 and 2006. It depicts the story of the Holy War launched by the Inrithi kingdoms against the heathen Fanim of the south to recover the holy city of Shimeh for the faithful. During the war, a man named Anasûrimbor Kellhus emerges from obscurity to become an exceptionally powerful and influential figure, and it is discovered that the Consult, an ancient alliance of forces united in their worship of the legendary No-God, a nihilistic force of destruction, are manipulating events to pave the way for the No-God's return to the mortal world, a Second Apocalypse to succeed the First.

The sequel series, the Aspect-Emperor quartet, picks up the story twenty years later with Kellhus leading the united Zaudunyani kingdoms in directly seeking out and confronting the Consult. The first novel in this new series, The Judging Eye, was published in January 2009 and the fourth, The Unholy Consult, was published in July 2017.

Science fiction, thrillers, mystery, and other works

Neuropath 
While working on the Prince of Nothing series, Bakker was prompted by a crux of events to write a thriller dealing with the cognitive sciences. He produced a near future science fiction novel involving a serial killer whose knowledge allows them to influence and control the human brain. This book is called Neuropath and was published in 2008.

The Disciple of the Dog 
Shortly before The Aspect-Emperor's second book, The White-Luck Warrior, was published, Bakker released a second novel outside of his main fantasy series. Titled Disciple of the Dog, it features the private investigator, Disciple Manning, who suffers from a condition reminiscent of hyperthymesia. The story revolves around Disciple's recounting of a case involving a missing girl, a cult, and the small-town drama of Ruddick. It was published in November 2010. Bakker has planned a number of follow up novels to Disciple of the Dog, including The Enlightened Dead, but due to the first novel's poor reception and very few reviews the sequels have not been pursued.

Other Works 
Bakker also has a number of unreleased works in progress, aside his fantasy opus, most notably Light, Time, and Gravity as well as an eventual anthology of short stories, Atrocity Tales, set within The Second Apocalypse fantasy narrative. A draft of Light, Time, and Gravity was released serially on Bakker's blog, Three Pound Brain, but has since been removed. It is described by a defunct Amazon.ca link as a "novel told from the perspective of a suicidal English professor, recalling his experiences as a seventeen-year-old working on a Southwestern Ontario tobacco farm in the summer of 1984. Part essay, part narrative, part present, part history, Light, Time, and Gravity is a kind of Notes from the Canadian Underground, a portrait of our culture’s abject failure to create a genuine Canadian identity, as well as a stinging indictment of Canada’s literary and intellectual elites."

Two other unreleased works of fiction in progress include the SF novellas Semantica and The Lollipop Factory. The former has been referenced by Bakker a number of times on his blog and is described by fans as a "rumoured title set in a world where nootropic and neurocosmetic techniques have created a class division between those with enhancements and those without, where superhuman Tweakers rebel and are hunted like animals by an oppressive government." The latter, The Lollipop Factory, has only been mentioned once by Bakker in a Reddit r/Fantasy AMA in 2017. Aside that it is a "short SF novel," nothing is yet known about this title.

Philosophy 
As The Prince of Nothing trilogy was being published circa. 2003-06 and Bakker experienced his initial rise in popularity, he participated frequently with fans at the now read-only Three-Seas forum. During this time Bakker consistently began to formulate and popularize what would eventually become the foundation for his Blind Brain Theory and Heuristic Neglect Theory then focusing on how studies of human cognitive biases generally and eventually on their impact on academic Philosophy and the greater humanities.

Blind Brain Hypothesis 
In 2008, Bakker published Neuropath, a near future SF psychothriller which thematically continued Bakker's elucidation of human cognitive biases and their implications regarding human meaning, purpose, and morality, whatever form they may take. While the narrative events of the book make for a compelling thought experiment, Bakker included as an Author Afterword a short essay regarding the blending of factual and fictive premises therein and the eventual advent of the narrative's villain in our own world. The essay marks Bakker first formal mention of his Blind Brain Hypothesis, beyond its use in the narrative proper.

Narrative aside, in the Author Afterword Bakker sources two real world examples concerning illusory consciousness, the inner human experience of temporality and the imperceptible limits of field of vision. In the essay, as in the book via the character Thomas, Bakker argues that the human sense of the "Now," this very moment, might be symptomatic of perceptual thresholds akin to the human inability to perceive beyond the field of vision, certain colours outside within that field, or the perceptual blind spot caused by the lack of receptors in a portion of the back of the eye. Bakker cites the inability of consciousness to experience and perceive but a sliver of all the brain's processing as indicative of consciousness experience being totally illusory, rather than only sometimes in some contexts. As per the world of Neuropath's narrative, Bakker also argues that in time non-invasive brain scanning, via something like the narrative conceit of "low-field fMRI," may result in an entirely new scale of institutional manipulation, moving beyond efforts of associative conditioning given the wealth of data prevalent real-time brain imaging could provide. Finally, central to the essay is Bakker's assertion that the scientific method and its progress would eventually yield unfathomable insights into human behavior and cognition such that the existence of the narrative's villain and his futuristic brain–computer interface are inevitable in real life as well.

The Semantic Apocalypse 
Shortly thereafter in 2008, Bakker presented The End of the World As We Know It: Neuroscience and the Semantic Apocalypse at Western University's Centre for the Study of Theory and Criticism, which was rebutted by then students Nick Srnicek and Ali McMillan. The title of Bakker's lecture, familiar to readers of Neuropath, references the Semantic Apocalypse, a theory attributed to one of the protagonist's professors.

Bakker begins the talk with a call to writers in the audience to reach beyond the confines of academia and their peers and instead write to challenge audiences who don't share the author's values and attitudes. He then summarizes again the narrative underpinnings of Neuropath's world where the technologies of neuroscience have reached technical and social maturity and prevalence.

The Semantic Apocalypse continues with a number of secondary arguments concerning pessimistic induction and what Bakker calls "Cognitive Closure FAPP." Regarding the former, Bakker explains that in all arenas historically science has replaced "intentional [or folk] explanations of natural phenomena with functional explanations." For Bakker it follows that this will inevitably extend to the brain and human cognition. On the latter, Bakker suggests that human culture and society have continually ignored the facts of our cognitive biases without due consideration of their impact. This gives rise to what Bakker refers to as the "Magical Belief Lottery:" the ignorance of a growing battery of confirmation biases concerning how humans rationalize behaviour and thought leading to conviction in long-held intentional or folk explanations of humans and their place in the world.

Building on his elucidations from Neuropath's Author Afterword, Bakker presents the metaphor of the Blind Brain Hypothesis as a magician's coin trick. By Bakker's argument the brain has evolved to process a prodigious amount of perceptual information regarding its local environment tracking natural objects with causal histories. Coin tricks through sleight of hand or misdirection exploit the brain's need for that causal history, confounding the brain's ability to process the coin's causal history. Given the central assumption of Blind Brain Hypothesis, that "information that finds its way to consciousness represents only a small fraction of the brain’s overall information load," humans are likely likewise unable to account for the causal history of thoughts and behaviours. It supposes that our conscious awareness of information processed by the brain is preceded by what Bakker calls here information horizons. Again Bakker draws upon the analogy of the eye's perceptual thresholds, this time highlighting that half of all the retinal nerves process information exclusively from the receptor rich fovea, and also extends that metaphor to speculate about the information horizons of our temporal field and the experience of the "Now."

Finishing his lecture and corresponding transcript, Bakker speaks on the money invested into using the advances in neuroscience to improve marketing techniques. Bakker also uses a metaphor on alien cognition describing beings whose brains and nervous systems had evolved to track their brain's causal history.

Three Pound Brain 
In May 2010, Bakker began a blog entitled Three Pound Brain, in order to grow his presence online following a period of inactivity after years of engaging on the defunct Three-Seas forum. Over the years, Bakker has billed the blog as "a crossroads between incompatible empires," a crux for disparate ideologies to engage each other. While the content of Bakker's posts has varied greatly over the years, the enduring theme has been the slow and steady digestion of topics through versions of Bakker's Blind Brain Hypothesis, which comes to be called the Blind Brain Theory on his blog over years. Along with blog post content ranging from sociocultural commentary to writing fiction and philosophy, Bakker also uses Three Pound Brain to host paper drafts, copies of his past academic work, speculative pieces, and samples and drafts of his fiction writing. Over time, he has engaged a wide variety of disparate interlocutors and his blog content has become more technical, resembling some of his earlier academic projects, as Bakker increasingly tackled the philosophical work of noteworthy philosophers, historical and contemporary, using the blog as his philosophic workshop.

The Future of Literature In the Age of Information 
Blog post from Three Pound Brain, October 2011.

The Last Magic Show 
In April 2012, Bakker added to Three Pound Brain a link to a draft of a paper he called The Last Magic Show: A Blind Brain Theory for the Appearance of Consciousness. The Last Magic Show was the first cumulative result of Bakker's efforts on Three Pound Brain and consolidated many terms invented or cited and appropriated across the previous two years of philosophic inquiry and analysis. The draft marked the first formal mention of Blind Brain Theory, as evolved from the Blind Brain Hypothesis. In his abstract Bakker describes the paper as addressing "[p]uzzles as profound and persistent as the now, personal identity, conscious unity, and most troubling of all, intentionality, could very well be kinds of illusions foisted on conscious awareness by different versions of the informatic limitation expressed, for instance, in the boundary of your visual field."

The title of Bakker's paper, A Blind Brain Theory for the Appearance of Consciousness, reflects his assertion therein that the Blind Brain Theory serves as a vehicle to describe and distinguish the features of how conscious experience appears to self-reflection rather than the actual specific systems and functioning underlying consciousness. To begin, Bakker imagines an explanatory vehicle he refers to as a Recursive System, the brain architecture which has evolved to track even more the basic architecture of itself, possibly akin to the relationship between the frontal cortex to the rest of the brain. Bakker suggests two parts to a Recursive System, the system "open," all the information processed by the brain, and the system "closed," referring to the information accessible to consciousness. The basic assumption regarding the existence of a Recursive System implies a limit on the information available to the RS-closed, conscious awareness, which Bakker dubs Informatic Asymmetry and its Asymptotic Limit. As specific examples Bakker refers to the cognitive psychology literature citing change blindness and inattentional bias (cognitive bias), wherein there are clear divergences between the information processed by the brain and information from the self-reports of perception.

As Bakker continues he expands on Informatic Asymmetry and the Asymptotic Limits of different Recursive Systems writing of information horizons, "the boundaries that delimit the recursive neural access that underwrites consciousness." Describing consciousness as encapsulated by the global limit of information horizons, Bakker highlights consciousness' inability to perceive any absence of information, that is processing outside of the RS-closed, as in some anosognosias. The information provided to consciousness is perceived as sufficient because the RS-closed is unable to track the discrepancy of the information processed by the whole brain. Bakker returns to the Coin Trick analogy from Neuropath's Author Afterword, using the magician as an extended explanatory metaphor to further elucidate Asymptotic Limits of specific Recursive Systems and the Asymptotic Complex of encapsulation regarding the experience of persistent global sufficiency, from where the paper almost certainly gets the former part of its title.

As before, Bakker builds on previous exposition reframing the experience of "the Now," with a portion of the draft directly referencing an older blog post. Likewise, he again uses the example of the visual field to propose a similar temporal explanation for the conscious experience the Now. Blind Brain Theory, Bakker writes, argues seemingly natural occurring anosognosias but maintains that this becomes ultimately problematic for our experience of identity and intentions.

Further elaborating, Bakker cites the phenomenon in psychophysics known as flicker fusion (or flicker fusion threshold), the point at which consciousness perceives a light as steady. This phenomenon is widely exploited in the modern human environment from light bulbs to screened devices and brings about similar explanatory power akin to Bakker's use of the visual field metaphor.

Nearing the close of The Last Magic Show, Bakker delves into the highly speculative implications of Blind Brain Theory's argument for the appearance of consciousness regarding the use and reference of Intentionality in academic philosophy, as well as, the very underpinnings of humanity's scientific and philosophic endeavours, logic and math, the latter of which might reference an earlier essayistic work posted to Three Pound Brain. He also writes of the "First-person Perspective Show," which almost definitely precedes his draft paper, The Introspective Peep Show. In the footnotes of The Last Magic Show, Bakker mentions that threads of his consideration have found themselves in every novel he's written, but that specifically "[o]nly Neuropath deals with the theory in any sustained manner." Bakker also takes care to distinguish Blind Brain Theory from eliminativism generally, in that, his theory "allows for a systematic diagnosis of the distortions and illusions belonging to the first person perspective."

The Introspective Peepshow 
Draft paper posted to Three Pound Brain, January 2013. Reposted as a reworked blog post, April 2013.

Through the Brain Darkly 
A proposed anthology of Three Pound Brain's essays and articles named for a fictional book that appears in Neuropath, mentioned on Three Pound Brain in April 2013. Later in September, 2013, Bakker later posted a draft essay possibly serving as the last piece to be included in Through the Brain Darkly.

Back to Square One 
An essay published on Scientia Salon, November 2014.

Crash Space 
A near future SF short announced on Three Pound Brain, November 2015, and released in Midwest Studies in Philosophy.

The Digital Dionysus 
An anthology of essays published in September 2016 examining "the importance of Nietzsche's thought for decoding the vicissitudes of our digital age" (Keith Ansell-Pearson); Bakker contributed a chapter based on the talk that he presented to the annual Nietzsche Workshop @ Western -- a conference which he had regularly attended in London, the final year of which took place at The New School in New York City..

From Scripture to Fantasy 
A paper published in Cosmos and History, January 2017.

On Alien Philosophy 
While an earlier draft of On Alien Philosophy was published on Three Pound Brain, August 2015, Bakker ultimately published the paper in the Journal of Consciousness Studies, Feb 2017.

Bibliography

The Second Apocalypse

The Prince of Nothing
 The Darkness That Comes Before (2004)
 The Warrior-Prophet (2005)
 The Thousandfold Thought (2006)

The Aspect-Emperor
 The Judging Eye (2009) 
 The White-Luck Warrior (2011) 
 The Great Ordeal (2016) 
 The Unholy Consult (2017)

Atrocity Tales
 The False Sun, Three Pound Brain, published in 2017 in The Unholy Consult
 The Four Revelations of Cinial'jin, Three Pound Brain, published in 2017 in The Unholy Consult
 The Knife of Many Hands, published in two parts in Grimdark Magazine #2 & #3, 2015
 The Carathayan, published in Evil is a Matter of Perspective

Short stories 
 Light, Time, and Gravity, Three Pound Brain
 The Long Held Breath, Three Pound Brain
 Reinstalling Eden, Nature (2013)
 What Was...And What Will Never Be, Three Pound Brain
 Crash Space, Midwest Studies in Philosophy (2015)
 The Dime Spared, Three Pound Brain

Disciple Manning novels
 Disciple of the Dog (2010)
 The Enlightened Dead (forthcoming)

Stand-alone novels
 Neuropath (2008)

Essay-collections
 Through the Brain Darkly: The Blind Brain Theory of R Scott Bakker (2013)
 The Digital Dionysus: Nietzsche & the Network-Centric Condition (2016)

External links

R. Scott Bakker Official, Fan, and Resource sites 
Bakker's blog
Second Apocalypse Forum Independently maintained fan forum endorsed by R. Scott Bakker.
R. Scott Bakker's The Devil's Chirp (Ambrose Bierce homage)
Bakkerfans Twitter
R. Scott Bakker's old SFF Forum  at SFFWorld
The Three-Seas Forum read-only archive
 
Bakker Subreddit

Interviews, Articles, Podcasts, and Presentations
The Skeptical Fantasist: In Defense of an Oxymoron an essay by R. Scott Bakker for Heliotrope Magazine
Scarlett Johansson Leaps to Your Lips. Interview with R. Scott Bakker on his Blind Brain Theory. Šum, June 2018
early Interview with Jay Tomio, 1 April 2006
The End of the World As We Know It: Neuroscience and the Semantic Apocalypse
Why Fantasy and Why Now?
Interview with R. Scott Bakker at SFFWorld
Addendum to the Bakker Interview: The Monkey Question (wotmania.com)
1st Q&A on wotmania.com
2nd Q&A on wotmania.com
 Interview at Blogcritics, 12 June 2008]
Video interview for Fantasy Hrvatska
Interview with Grimdark Magazine
Sci-Fi Fan Letter: R. Scott Bakker Interview
The SF Site: A Conversation With R. Scott Bakker
SFFWorld: Interview with R. Scott Bakker, March 2008
SFFWorld: Interview with R. Scott Bakker, December 2005
Dog to Dog: A Conversation with Scott Bakker and James Sallis
Pat's Fantasy Hotlist: New R. Scott Bakker Interview, January 2008
Pat's Fantasy Hotlist: New R. Scott Bakker Interview, April 2008

Pat's Fantasy Hotlist: New R. Scott Bakker Interview, January 2009
Pat's Fantasy Hotlist: New R. Scott Bakker Interview (part 1), June 2011
Pat's Fantasy Hotlist: R. Scott Bakker Interview (part 2) July 2011
Pat's Fantasy Hotlist: New R. Scott Bakker Interview, June 2016
Stuff to Blow Your Mind: R. Scott Bakker: On Alien Philosophy and Fantasy
Stuff to Blow Your Mind: Bonus: R. Scott Bakker, Consciousness & Consult
Grim Tidings Podcast: Interview with R. Scott Bakker
CBC Ideas: The Fool's Dilemma

References

Canadian fantasy writers
21st-century Canadian novelists
Living people
People from Norfolk County, Ontario
Canadian people of Dutch descent
1967 births
University of Western Ontario alumni
Vanderbilt University alumni
Canadian male novelists
21st-century Canadian male writers